The following is a partial list of the "C" codes for Medical Subject Headings (MeSH), as defined by the United States National Library of Medicine (NLM).

This list continues the information at List of MeSH codes (C15). Codes following these are found at List of MeSH codes (C17). For other MeSH codes, see List of MeSH codes.

The source for this content is the set of 2006 MeSH Trees from the NLM.

– congenital, hereditary, and neonatal diseases and abnormalities

– abnormalities

– abnormalities, drug-induced

– abnormalities, multiple
  – Alagille syndrome
  – Angelman syndrome
  – Bardet–Biedl syndrome
  – basal-cell nevus syndrome
  – Beckwith–Wiedemann syndrome
  – Bloom syndrome
  – branchio-oto-renal syndrome
  – Cockayne syndrome
  – cri du chat syndrome
  – De Lange syndrome
  – Down syndrome
  – ectodermal dysplasia
  – Ellis–van Creveld syndrome
  – focal dermal hypoplasia
  – neurocutaneous syndromes
  – Gardner's syndrome
  – holoprosencephaly
  – incontinentia pigmenti
  – Laurence–Moon syndrome
  – Leopard syndrome
  – Marfan syndrome
  – Möbius syndrome
  – nail–patella syndrome
  – oculocerebrorenal syndrome
  – orofaciodigital syndromes
  – POEMS syndrome
  – Prader–Willi syndrome
  – proteus syndrome
  – prune belly syndrome
  – rubella syndrome, congenital
  – Rubinstein–Taybi syndrome
  – Short rib – polydactyly syndrome
  – Smith–Lemli–Opitz syndrome
  – Waardenburg syndrome
  – Wolfram syndrome
  – Zellweger syndrome

– abnormalities, radiation-induced

– cardiovascular abnormalities
  – arterio-arterial fistula
  – arteriovenous malformations
  – arteriovenous fistula
  – intracranial arteriovenous malformations
  – central nervous system vascular malformations
  – heart defects, congenital
  – aortic coarctation
  – arrhythmogenic right ventricular dysplasia
  – cor triatriatum
  – coronary vessel anomalies
  – crisscross heart
  – dextrocardia
  – Kartagener syndrome
  – ductus arteriosus, patent
  – Ebstein's anomaly
  – Eisenmenger complex
  – heart septal defects
  – aortopulmonary septal defect
  – endocardial cushion defects
  – heart septal defects, atrial
  – Lutembacher's syndrome
  – Trilogy of Fallot
  – heart septal defects, ventricular
  – hypoplastic left heart syndrome
  – Leopard syndrome
  – levocardia
  – Marfan syndrome
  – Tetralogy of Fallot
  – transposition of great vessels
  – double outlet right ventricle
  – tricuspid atresia
  – truncus arteriosus, persistent
  – pulmonary atresia
  – scimitar syndrome

– chromosome disorders
  – Angelman syndrome
  – Beckwith–Wiedemann syndrome
  – branchio-oto-renal syndrome
  – cri du chat syndrome
  – De Lange syndrome
  – Down syndrome
  – holoprosencephaly
  – Prader–Willi syndrome
  – Rubinstein–Taybi syndrome
  – sex chromosome disorders
  – ectodermal dysplasia
  – focal dermal hypoplasia
  – fragile X syndrome
  – gonadal dysgenesis, 46,xy
  – gonadal dysgenesis, mixed
  – Klinefelter syndrome
  – orofaciodigital syndromes
  – Turner syndrome
  – WAGR syndrome
  – Williams syndrome

– DiGeorge syndrome

– digestive system abnormalities
  – anus, imperforate
  – biliary atresia
  – choledochal cyst
  – Caroli disease
  – diaphragmatic eventration
  – esophageal atresia
  – Hirschsprung's disease
  – intestinal atresia
  – Meckel's diverticulum

– eye abnormalities
  – aniridia
  – WAGR syndrome
  – anophthalmos
  – blepharophimosis
  – coloboma
  – ectopia lentis
  – hydrophthalmos
  – microphthalmos
  – retinal dysplasia

– lymphatic abnormalities
  – lymphangiectasis, intestinal

– monsters
  – anencephaly
  – twins, conjoined

– musculoskeletal abnormalities
  – arthrogryposis
  – craniofacial abnormalities
  – cleidocranial dysplasia
  – craniofacial dysostosis
  – Hallermann's syndrome
  – hypertelorism
  – mandibulofacial dysostosis
  – goldenhar syndrome
  – craniosynostoses
  – acrocephalosyndactylia
  – holoprosencephaly
  – Leopard syndrome
  – maxillofacial abnormalities
  – cherubism
  – jaw abnormalities
  – cleft palate
  – micrognathism
  – Pierre Robin syndrome
  – prognathism
  – retrognathism
  – microcephaly
  – Noonan syndrome
  – orofaciodigital syndromes
  – plagiocephaly, nonsynostotic
  – platybasia
  – Rubinstein–Taybi syndrome
  – funnel chest
  – gastroschisis
  – Hajdu–Cheney syndrome
  – hip dislocation, congenital
  – Klippel–Feil syndrome
  – limb deformities, congenital
  – ectromelia
  – foot deformities, congenital
  – hand deformities, congenital
  – lower extremity deformities, congenital
  – polydactyly
  – short rib – polydactyly syndrome
  – proteus syndrome
  – syndactyly
  – acrocephalosyndactylia
  – Poland syndrome
  – thanatophoric dysplasia
  – upper extremity deformities, congenital
  – synostosis
  – craniosynostoses
  – acrocephalosyndactylia
  – syndactyly
  – acrocephalosyndactylia
  – Poland syndrome

– nervous system malformations
  – central nervous system cyst
  – arachnoid cyst
  – central nervous system vascular malformations
  – hemangioma, cavernous, central nervous system
  – central nervous system venous angioma
  – sinus pericranii
  – Dandy–Walker syndrome
  – hereditary motor and sensory neuropathies
  – Charcot–Marie–Tooth disease
  – Refsum disease
  – spastic paraplegia, hereditary
  – hereditary sensory and autonomic neuropathies
  – dysautonomia, familial
  – holoprosencephaly
  – hydranencephaly
  – intracranial arteriovenous malformations
  – neural tube defects
  – anencephaly
  – Arnold–Chiari malformation
  – encephalocele
  – meningocele
  – meningomyelocele
  – spinal dysraphism
  – spina bifida cystica
  – spina bifida occulta
  – septo-optic dysplasia

– respiratory system abnormalities
  – bronchogenic cyst
  – bronchopulmonary sequestration
  – choanal atresia
  – cystic adenomatoid malformation of lung, congenital
  – kartagener syndrome
  – scimitar syndrome
  – tracheobronchomegaly

– situs inversus
  – dextrocardia
  – kartagener syndrome
  – levocardia

– skin abnormalities
  – acrodermatitis
  – dyskeratosis congenita
  – ectodermal dysplasia
  – Ellis–van Creveld syndrome
  – focal dermal hypoplasia
  – neurocutaneous syndromes
  – Ehlers–Danlos syndrome
  – epidermolysis bullosa
  – epidermolysis bullosa acquisita
  – epidermolysis bullosa dystrophica
  – epidermolysis bullosa, junctional
  – epidermolysis bullosa simplex
  – ichthyosis
  – ichthyosiform erythroderma, congenital
  – hyperkeratosis, epidermolytic
  – ichthyosis, lamellar
  – ichthyosis vulgaris
  – ichthyosis, x-linked
  – Sjögren–Larsson syndrome
  – incontinentia pigmenti
  – port-wine stain
  – pseudoxanthoma elasticum
  – Rothmund–Thomson syndrome
  – sclerema neonatorum
  – xeroderma pigmentosum

– stomatognathic system abnormalities
  – maxillofacial abnormalities
  – jaw abnormalities
  – cleft palate
  – micrognathism
  – Pierre Robin syndrome
  – prognathism
  – retrognathism
  – mouth abnormalities
  – cleft lip
  – cleft palate
  – fibromatosis, gingival
  – macrostomia
  – microstomia
  – velopharyngeal insufficiency
  – tooth abnormalities
  – amelogenesis imperfecta
  – dental enamel hypoplasia
  – anodontia
  – dens in dente
  – dentin dysplasia
  – dentinogenesis imperfecta
  – fused teeth
  – odontodysplasia
  – tooth, supernumerary

– thyroid dysgenesis
  – lingual thyroid
  – lingual goiter

– urogenital abnormalities
  – bladder exstrophy
  – cryptorchidism
  – epispadias
  – frasier syndrome
  – hypospadias
  – multicystic dysplastic kidney
  – nephritis, hereditary
  – sex differentiation disorders
  – freemartinism
  – gonadal dysgenesis
  – gonadal dysgenesis, 46,xx
  – gonadal dysgenesis, 46,xy
  – gonadal dysgenesis, mixed
  – turner syndrome
  – hermaphroditism
  – hermaphroditism, true
  – pseudohermaphroditism
  – androgen insensitivity syndrome
  – Denys–Drash syndrome
  – Kallmann syndrome
  – Klinefelter syndrome
  – WAGR syndrome

– fetal diseases

– chorioamnionitis

– erythroblastosis, fetal
  – hydrops fetalis

– fetal alcohol syndrome

– fetal hypoxia

– fetal growth retardation

– fetal macrosomia

– meconium aspiration syndrome

– genetic diseases, inborn

– adrenal hyperplasia, congenital

– anemia, hemolytic, congenital
  – anemia, dyserythropoietic, congenital
  – anemia, hemolytic, congenital nonspherocytic
  – anemia, sickle cell
  – hemoglobin SC disease
  – sickle cell trait
  – elliptocytosis, hereditary
  – glucosephosphate dehydrogenase deficiency
  – favism
  – hemoglobin c disease
  – spherocytosis, hereditary
  – thalassemia
  – alpha-thalassemia
  – beta-thalassemia

– anemia, hypoplastic, congenital
  – anemia, Diamond–Blackfan
  – fanconi anemia

– ataxia telangiectasia

– blood coagulation disorders, inherited
  – activated protein C resistance
  – afibrinogenemia
  – antithrombin III deficiency
  – Bernard–Soulier syndrome
  – factor V deficiency
  – factor VII deficiency
  – factor X deficiency
  – factor XI deficiency
  – factor XII deficiency
  – factor XIII deficiency
  – hemophilia A
  – hemophilia B
  – Hermansky–Pudlak syndrome
  – hypoprothrombinemias
  – protein C deficiency
  – thrombasthenia
  – Von Willebrand disease
  – Wiskott–Aldrich syndrome

– CADASIL

– cardiomyopathy, hypertrophic, familial

– cherubism

– chromosome disorders
  – angelman syndrome
  – Beckwith–Wiedemann syndrome
  – branchio-oto-renal syndrome
  – cri du chat syndrome  – De Lange syndrome
  – Down syndrome
  – holoprosencephaly
  – Prader–Willi syndrome
  – Rubinstein–Taybi syndrome
  – sex chromosome disorders
  – ectodermal dysplasia
  – focal dermal hypoplasia
  – fragile X syndrome
  – gonadal dysgenesis, 46,xy
  – gonadal dysgenesis, mixed
  – Klinefelter syndrome
  – orofaciodigital syndromes
  – Turner syndrome
  – WAGR syndrome
  – Williams syndrome

– cystic fibrosis

– dwarfism
  – achondroplasia
  – cockayne syndrome
  – congenital hypothyroidism
  – laron syndrome
  – mulibrey nanism

– eye diseases, hereditary
  – albinism
  – albinism, ocular
  – albinism, oculocutaneous
  – Hermansky–Pudlak syndrome
  – piebaldism
  – aniridia
  – WAGR syndrome
  – choroideremia
  – corneal dystrophies, hereditary
  – Fuchs' endothelial dystrophy
  – Duane retraction syndrome
  – gyrate atrophy
  – optic atrophies, hereditary
  – optic atrophy, hereditary, leber
  – optic atrophy, autosomal dominant
  – Wolfram syndrome
  – retinal dysplasia
  – retinitis pigmentosa
  – Usher syndromes

– familial Mediterranean fever

– genetic diseases, x-linked
  – androgen insensitivity syndrome
  – choroideremia
  – dyskeratosis congenita
  – fabry disease
  – focal dermal hypoplasia
  – glycogen storage disease type IIb
  – glycogen storage disease type VIII
  – granulomatous disease, chronic
  – ichthyosis, x-linked
  – hemophilia B
  – mental retardation, x-linked
  – adrenoleukodystrophy
  – Coffin–Lowry syndrome
  – fragile X syndrome
  – Lesch–Nyhan syndrome
  – Menkes kinky hair syndrome
  – mucopolysaccharidosis II
  – pyruvate dehydrogenase complex deficiency disease
  – Rett syndrome
  – muscular dystrophy, Duchenne
  – muscular dystrophy, Emery–Dreifuss
  – oculocerebrorenal syndrome
  – Pelizaeus–Merzbacher disease
  – Wiskott–Aldrich syndrome

– genetic diseases, y-linked

– Hajdu–Cheney syndrome

– hemoglobinopathies
  – anemia, sickle cell
  – hemoglobin sc disease
  – sickle cell trait
  – hemoglobin c disease
  – thalassemia
  – alpha-thalassemia
  – hydrops fetalis
  – beta-thalassemia

– heredodegenerative disorders, nervous system
  – Alexander disease
  – amyloid neuropathies, familial
  – Canavan disease
  – Cockayne syndrome
  – dystonia musculorum deformans
  – Gerstmann–Sträussler–Scheinker disease
  – Hallervorden–Spatz syndrome
  – hepatolenticular degeneration
  – hereditary central nervous system demyelinating diseases
  – hereditary motor and sensory neuropathies
  – Charcot–Marie–Tooth disease
  – Refsum disease
  – spastic paraplegia, hereditary
  – hereditary sensory and autonomic neuropathies
  – dysautonomia, familial
  – Huntington disease
  – Lafora disease
  – Lesch–Nyhan syndrome
  – Menkes kinky hair syndrome
  – mental retardation, x-linked
  – adrenoleukodystrophy
  – Coffin–Lowry syndrome
  – fragile X syndrome
  – Lesch–Nyhan syndrome
  – Menkes kinky hair syndrome
  – mucopolysaccharidosis II
  – pyruvate dehydrogenase complex deficiency disease
  – Rett syndrome
  – myotonia congenita
  – myotonic dystrophy
  – neurofibromatosis
  – neurofibromatosis 1
  – neurofibromatosis 2
  – neuronal ceroid-lipofuscinosis
  – optic atrophies, hereditary
  – optic atrophy, hereditary, leber
  – optic atrophy, autosomal dominant
  – Wolfram syndrome
  – Rett syndrome
  – spinal muscular atrophies of childhood
  – spinocerebellar degenerations
  – Friedreich's ataxia
  – myoclonic cerebellar dyssynergia
  – olivopontocerebellar atrophies
  – spinocerebellar ataxias
  – Machado–Joseph disease
  – Tourette syndrome
  – tuberous sclerosis
  – Unverricht–Lundborg syndrome

– hyperthyroxinemia, familial dysalbuminemic

– Jervell and Lange-Nielsen syndrome

– kallmann syndrome

– kartagener syndrome

– marfan syndrome

– metabolism, inborn errors
  – amino acid metabolism, inborn errors
  – albinism
  – albinism, ocular
  – albinism, oculocutaneous
  – Hermansky–Pudlak syndrome
  – piebaldism
  – alkaptonuria
  – aminoaciduria, renal
  – cystinuria
  – Hartnup disease
  – carbamoyl-phosphate synthase I deficiency disease
  – citrullinemia
  – homocystinuria
  – hyperargininemia
  – hyperglycinemia, nonketotic
  – hyperhomocysteinemia
  – hyperlysinemias
  – maple syrup urine disease
  – multiple carboxylase deficiency
  – biotinidase deficiency
  – holocarboxylase synthetase deficiency
  – ornithine carbamoyltransferase deficiency disease
  – phenylketonurias
  – phenylketonuria, maternal
  – tyrosinemias
  – amino acid transport disorders, inborn
  – Hartnup disease
  – oculocerebrorenal syndrome
  – amyloidosis, familial
  – amyloid neuropathies, familial
  – cerebral amyloid angiopathy, familial
  – brain diseases, metabolic, inborn
  – abetalipoproteinemia
  – carbamoyl-phosphate synthase I deficiency disease
  – cerebral amyloid angiopathy, familial
  – citrullinemia
  – galactosemias
  – Hartnup disease
  – hepatolenticular degeneration
  – homocystinuria
  – hyperargininemia
  – hyperglycinemia, nonketotic
  – hyperlysinemias
  – Leigh disease
  – Lesch–Nyhan syndrome
  – lysosomal storage diseases, nervous system
  – fucosidosis
  – glycogen storage disease type II
  – mucolipidoses
  – sialic acid storage disease
  – sphingolipidoses
  – Fabry disease  – gangliosidoses
  – gangliosidoses GM2
  – Sandhoff disease
  – Tay–Sachs disease
  – Tay–Sachs disease, AB variant
  – gangliosidosis GM1
  – Gaucher disease
  – leukodystrophy, globoid cell
  – leukodystrophy, metachromatic
  – Niemann–Pick diseases
  – maple syrup urine disease
  – MELAS syndrome
  – Menkes kinky hair syndrome
  – MERRF syndrome
  – oculocerebrorenal syndrome
  – ornithine carbamoyltransferase deficiency disease
  – peroxisomal disorders
  – adrenoleukodystrophy
  – Refsum disease
  – Zellweger syndrome
  – phenylketonurias
  – phenylketonuria, maternal
  – pyruvate carboxylase deficiency disease
  – pyruvate dehydrogenase complex deficiency disease
  – tyrosinemias
  – carbohydrate metabolism, inborn errors
  – carbohydrate-deficient glycoprotein syndrome
  – fructose metabolism, inborn errors
  – fructose-1,6-diphosphatase deficiency
  – Hereditary fructose intolerance
  – fucosidosis
  – galactosemias
  – glycogen storage disease
  – glycogen storage disease type I
  – glycogen storage disease type II
  – glycogen storage disease type IIb
  – glycogen storage disease type III
  – glycogen storage disease type IV
  – glycogen storage disease type V
  – glycogen storage disease type VI
  – glycogen storage disease type VII
  – glycogen storage disease type VIII
  – hyperoxaluria, primary
  – lactose intolerance
  – mannosidase deficiency diseases
  – alpha-mannosidosis
  – beta-mannosidosis
  – mucolipidoses
  – mucopolysaccharidoses
  – mucopolysaccharidosis I
  – mucopolysaccharidosis II
  – mucopolysaccharidosis III
  – mucopolysaccharidosis IV
  – mucopolysaccharidosis VI
  – mucopolysaccharidosis VII
  – multiple carboxylase deficiency
  – biotinidase deficiency
  – holocarboxylase synthetase deficiency
  – nesidioblastosis
  – persistent hyperinsulinemia hypoglycemia of infancy
  – pyruvate metabolism, inborn errors
  – Leigh disease
  – pyruvate carboxylase deficiency disease
  – pyruvate dehydrogenase complex deficiency disease
  – cytochrome-c oxidase deficiency
  – glucosephosphate dehydrogenase deficiency
  – hyperbilirubinemia, hereditary
  – Crigler–Najjar syndrome
  – Gilbert disease
  – jaundice, chronic idiopathic
  – lipid metabolism, inborn errors
  – hypercholesterolemia, familial
  – hyperlipidemia, familial combined
  – hypercholesterolemia, familial
  – hyperlipoproteinemia type IV
  – hyperlipoproteinemia type III
  – hyperlipoproteinemia type IV
  – hyperlipoproteinemia type V
  – hypolipoproteinemia
  – abetalipoproteinemia
  – hypobetalipoproteinemia
  – lecithin acyltransferase deficiency
  – Tangier disease
  – lipoidosis
  – cholesterol ester storage disease
  – lipoidproteinosis
  – neuronal ceroid-lipofuscinosis
  – refsum disease
  – sjogren-larsson syndrome
  – sphingolipidoses
  – Fabry disease
  – gangliosidoses
  – gangliosidoses GM2
  – Sandhoff disease
  – Tay–Sachs disease
  – Tay–Sachs disease, AB variant
  – gangliosidosis GM1
  – Gaucher disease
  – leukodystrophy, globoid cell
  – leukodystrophy, metachromatic
  – Niemann–Pick diseases
  – sea-blue histiocyte syndrome
  – Wolman disease
  – lipoprotein lipase deficiency, familial
  – peroxisomal disorders
  – acatalasia
  – adrenoleukodystrophy
  – chondrodysplasia punctata, rhizomelic
  – Refsum disease
  – Zellweger syndrome
  – Smith–Lemli–Opitz syndrome
  – xanthomatosis, cerebrotendinous
  – lysosomal storage diseases
  – cholesterol ester storage disease
  – lysosomal storage diseases, nervous system
  – fucosidosis
  – glycogen storage disease type II
  – mucolipidoses
  – sialic acid storage disease
  – sphingolipidoses
  – Fabry disease
  – gangliosidoses
  – gangliosidoses GM2
  – Sandhoff disease
  – Tay–Sachs disease
  – Tay–Sachs disease, AB variant
  – gangliosidosis GM1
  – Gaucher disease
  – leukodystrophy, globoid cell
  – leukodystrophy, metachromatic
  – Niemann–Pick diseases
  – mannosidase deficiency diseases
  – alpha-mannosidosis
  – beta-mannosidosis
  – mucopolysaccharidoses
  – mucopolysaccharidosis I
  – mucopolysaccharidosis II
  – mucopolysaccharidosis III
  – mucopolysaccharidosis IV
  – mucopolysaccharidosis VI
  – mucopolysaccharidosis VII
  – sphingolipidoses
  – Fabry disease
  – gangliosidoses
  – gangliosidoses GM2
  – Sandhoff disease
  – Tay–Sachs disease
  – Tay–Sachs disease, AB variant
  – Gaucher disease
  – leukodystrophy, globoid cell
  – leukodystrophy, metachromatic
  – niemann-pick diseases
  – sea-blue histiocyte syndrome
  – Wolman disease
  – metal metabolism, inborn errors
  – hemochromatosis
  – hepatolenticular degeneration
  – hypophosphatasia
  – hypophosphatemia, familial
  – Menkes kinky hair syndrome
  – paralyses, familial periodic
  – hypokalemic periodic paralysis
  – paralysis, hyperkalemic periodic
  – Andersen syndrome
  – pseudohypoparathyroidism
  – pseudopseudohypoparathyroidism
  – porphyria, erythropoietic
  – porphyrias, hepatic
  – coproporphyria, hereditary
  – porphyria, acute intermittent
  – porphyria cutanea tarda
  – porphyria, hepatoerythropoietic
  – porphyria, variegate
  – protoporphyria, erythropoietic
  – progeria
  – purine–pyrimidine metabolism, inborn errors
  – gout
  – arthritis, gouty
  – Lesch–Nyhan syndrome
  – renal tubular transport, inborn errors
  – acidosis, renal tubular
  – aminoaciduria, renal
  – cystinuria
  – Hartnup disease
  – cystinosis
  – Fanconi syndrome
  – glycosuria, renal
  – hypophosphatemia, familial
  – oculocerebrorenal syndrome
  – pseudohypoaldosteronism
  – steroid metabolism, inborn errors
  – adrenal hyperplasia, congenital
  – mineralocorticoid excess syndrome, apparent
  – ichthyosis, x-linked
  – Smith–Lemli–Opitz syndrome

– muscular dystrophies
  – distal myopathies
  – glycogen storage disease type VII
  – muscular dystrophies, limb-girdle
  – muscular dystrophy, Duchenne
  – muscular dystrophy, Emery–Dreifuss
  – muscular dystrophy, facioscapulohumeral
  – muscular dystrophy, oculopharyngeal
  – myotonic dystrophy

– myasthenic syndromes, congenital

– nail–patella syndrome

– neoplastic syndromes, hereditary
  – adenomatous polyposis coli
  – Gardner's syndrome
  – basal-cell nevus syndrome
  – colorectal neoplasms, hereditary nonpolyposis
  – dysplastic nevus syndrome
  – exostoses, multiple hereditary
  – hamartoma syndrome, multiple
  – Li–Fraumeni syndrome
  – multiple endocrine neoplasia
  – multiple endocrine neoplasia type 1
  – multiple endocrine neoplasia type 2a
  – multiple endocrine neoplasia type 2b
  – Wilms' tumor
  – Denys–Drash syndrome
  – WAGR syndrome
  – Neurofibromatosis
  – neurofibromatosis 1
  – neurofibromatosis 2
  – Peutz–Jeghers syndrome
  – Sturge–Weber syndrome

– osteogenesis imperfecta

– pain insensitivity, congenital

– Romano–Ward syndrome

– skin diseases, genetic
  – albinism
  – albinism, ocular
  – albinism, oculocutaneous
  – Hermansky–Pudlak syndrome
  – piebaldism
  – cutis laxa
  – dermatitis, atopic
  – dyskeratosis congenita
  – ectodermal dysplasia
  – Ellis–van Creveld syndrome
  – focal dermal hypoplasia
  – neurocutaneous syndromes
  – Ehlers–Danlos syndrome
  – epidermolysis bullosa
  – epidermolysis bullosa dystrophica
  – epidermolysis bullosa, junctional
  – epidermolysis bullosa simplex
  – ichthyosiform erythroderma, congenital
  – hyperkeratosis, epidermolytic
  – ichthyosis, lamellar
  – ichthyosis vulgaris
  – ichthyosis, x-linked
  – incontinentia pigmenti
  – keratoderma, palmoplantar
  – keratoderma, palmoplantar, diffuse
  – Papillon–Lefèvre disease
  – keratosis follicularis
  – pemphigus, benign familial
  – porokeratosis
  – porphyria, erythropoietic
  – porphyrias, hepatic
  – coproporphyria, hereditary
  – porphyria, acute intermittent
  – porphyria cutanea tarda
  – porphyria, hepatoerythropoietic
  – porphyria, variegate
  – protoporphyria, erythropoietic
  – pseudoxanthoma elasticum
  – Rothmund–Thomson syndrome
  – Sjögren–Larsson syndrome
  – xeroderma pigmentosum

– Werner syndrome

– infant, newborn, diseases

– amniotic band syndrome

– anemia, neonatal
  – fetofetal transfusion
  – fetomaternal transfusion

– asphyxia neonatorum

– birth injuries
  – paralysis, obstetric

– cystic fibrosis

– epilepsy, benign neonatal

– erythroblastosis, fetal
  – kernicterus

– hemorrhagic disease of newborn

– hernia, umbilical

– hydrocephalus
  – Dandy–Walker syndrome

– hydrophthalmos

– hyperbilirubinemia, neonatal
  – jaundice, neonatal
  – jaundice, chronic idiopathic

– hyperostosis, cortical, congenital

– ichthyosis
  – ichthyosiform erythroderma, congenital
  – hyperkeratosis, epidermolytic
  – ichthyosis, lamellar
  – ichthyosis, x-linked
  – Sjögren–Larsson syndrome

– infant, premature, diseases
  – bronchopulmonary dysplasia
  – leukomalacia, periventricular
  – respiratory distress syndrome, newborn
  – hyaline membrane disease
  – retinopathy of prematurity

– meconium aspiration syndrome

– Möbius syndrome

– neonatal abstinence syndrome

– nystagmus, congenital

– ophthalmia neonatorum

– persistent fetal circulation syndrome

– persistent hyperinsulinemia hypoglycemia of infancy

– Rothmund–Thomson syndrome

– sclerema neonatorum

– severe combined immunodeficiency

– syphilis, congenital

– thanatophoric dysplasia

– toxoplasmosis, congenital

– Wolman disease

The list continues at List of MeSH codes (C17).

MeSH
C16